The Warren is a  nature reserve in St Mary Cray in the London Borough of Bromley. It is a Site of Borough Importance for Nature Conservation, Grade I, and is managed by the London Wildlife Trust.

The site is mainly ancient oak and silver birch woodland with a ground flora of bracken, foxgloves and bluebells. The wood is open, with grass clearings, and there is a pond which has rare London plants such as blue fleabane and hare's-foot clover. Birds include green woodpeckers and nuthatches, and there are many bees and butterflies.

There is access from Sheepcote Lane.

References

Nature reserves in the London Borough of Bromley
London Wildlife Trust